Coexistence may refer to:
Coexistence (political party), Czechoslovak and later Slovak political party
Peaceful coexistence, Soviet theory regarding relations between the socialist and capitalist blocs, and more generally the coexistence of different states in the international system
Coexistence of similar species in similar environments; see coexistence theory
Coexistence of multiple national groups within a polity; see plurinationalism
COEXISTENCE (exhibition) 
 voting system, also called parallel voting

See also

Coexist (disambiguation)